Key Largo was a 1939 Broadway play written in blank verse by Maxwell Anderson that became the basis for the 1948 film by the same name. The play ran for 105 performances in 1939 at the Ethel Barrymore Theatre from November 27, 1939 to February 24, 1940. It was produced by the Playwrights' Company and staged by Guthrie McClintic, with scenic design created by noted designer Jo Mielziner. This was actor James Gregory's Broadway debut, playing the character "Jerry".

The rights to the play were bought by producer Jerry Wald. Wald convinced maverick film director John Huston to turn this into the 1948 film Key Largo starring Humphrey Bogart, Edward G. Robinson, and Lauren Bacall.

The film script was heavily changed from the play. John Huston was so angry about the deficiencies in the play that he barred producer Jerry Wald from the set of the film. It was believed that Huston was in a rage over the House Un-American Activities Committee (HUAC) hearings and didn't want to adapt a play by a reactionary who hated Franklin Delano Roosevelt.

Plot
A deserter of the Spanish Civil War played by Paul Muni redeems himself in death by defending the family of a true war hero against some Mexican bandits on the tiny Florida island of Key Largo.

Cast

References

External links
"Key Largo" on the Internet Broadway Database

Plays by Maxwell Anderson
1939 plays
Broadway plays
Plays set in Spain
Plays set in Florida
American plays adapted into films
Key Largo